Freivalds can refer to:

People
Laila Freivalds, Swedish politician
Rūsiņš Mārtiņš Freivalds, Latvian mathematician

Mathematics
Freivalds' algorithm